Give Love at Christmas is a Christmas album by the Temptations, released in 1980 via Gordy Records. The group's second holiday release following 1970's The Temptations Christmas Card, it features each Temptation leading on various popular Christmas carols and original Christmas songs. The album includes versions of The Jackson 5's "Give Love on Christmas Day", "The Little Drummer Boy", "This Christmas", and "Silent Night", alongside originals written or co-written by Motown founder Berry Gordy, Jr. and Motown star and vice-president Smokey Robinson.

The Temptations' 1980 recording of "Silent Night" (punctuated by bass singer Melvin Franklin's sign-off of "Merry Christmas, from the Temptations!") became an enduring staple of rhythm and blues radio during the holiday season.  In addition to "Silent Night", "The Christmas Song" and "Little Drummer Boy" also was previously recorded on their previous Christmas album The Temptations Christmas Card.

Track listing

 Note: Some pressings incorrectly list The Christmas Song on the label as being 5:36. This is incorrect.

Personnel
Dennis Edwards: vocals
Glenn Leonard: vocals
Richard Street: vocals
Melvin Franklin: vocals
Otis Williams: vocals

See also
The Temptations Christmas Card (1970)

References

The Temptations albums
1980 Christmas albums
Christmas albums by American artists
Gordy Records albums
Albums produced by Gil Askey
Rhythm and blues Christmas albums